Christian Christiansen (9 October 1843 in Lønborg, Denmark – 28 November 1917 Frederiksberg) was a Danish physicist.

Christiansen first taught at the local polytechnical school. In 1886, he was appointed to a chair for physics at the University of Copenhagen.

He mainly studied radiant heat and optical dispersion, discovering the Christiansen effect (Christiansen filter). Around 1917, he discovered the anomalous dispersion of numerous dyes, including aniline red (fuchsine), by recording absorption spectra.

In 1884, he confirmed the Stefan–Boltzmann law.

Christiansen was elected a member of the Royal Swedish Academy of Sciences in 1902.

He was doctoral advisor to Niels Bohr. In 1912, he retired and Martin Knudsen became professor.

Citations
 C. Christiansen, Lærebog i fysik, Copenhagen, 1892
 C. Christiansen, Indledning til den mathematiske Fysik, 2 Bde, 1887-1889
 C. Christiansen, Untersuchungen über die optischen Eigenschaften von fein vertheilten Körpern - Erste Mittheilung, Ann. Phys., Vol. 23, pp. 298–306, 1884
 C. Christiansen, Untersuchungen über die optischen Eigenschaften von fein vertheilten Körpern - Zweite Mittheilung, Ann. Phys., vol. 24, pp. 439–446, 1885
 C. Christiansen Elements of Theoretical Physics translated into English by W. F. Magie from the German translation of Johannes Julius Christoph Müller (London, McMillan, 1897)

References

External links
 Physics Tree: Christian Christiansen Details
 Christiansen effect

Danish physicists
Optical physicists
1843 births
1917 deaths
Members of the Royal Swedish Academy of Sciences
Members of the Royal Society of Sciences in Uppsala